The Church of Jesus Christ of Latter-day Saints in Florida refers to the Church of Jesus Christ of Latter-day Saints (LDS Church) and its members in Florida.
The LDS Church represents about 1% of the population of Florida according to the Pew Research Center 2014 Religious Landscepe Survey. Official membership statistics show the church representing about 0.75% of the general population.  Florida has the 8th largest membership population in the United States and the largest membership population east of the Mississippi. The LDS Church is the 6th largest denomination in Florida.

History

In April 1843, Joseph Smith called William Brown and Daniel Cathcart to serve a mission to Pensacola, but no record exists of them fulfilling the calling.
Between April and June 1854, Phineas Young visited the Indian chiefs in Florida and distributed copies of the Book of Mormon.

Missionaries began preaching in Pensacola in January 1895 and started a number of Sunday Schools soon afterwards.  The first was in Coe Mills in May 1895.  The first branch, known as the Hassell Branch, was created in Jefferson County on May 9, 1897.  In September 1897, the Sanderson Branch was organized.  George P. Canova, a well-to-do landowner and chairman of the Baker County Commission, became the branch president in January 1898.  Five months later, following threats of violence, Canova was killed as he returned home from a church meeting.

In 1906, Charles A. Callis became president of the Florida Conference. That same year, a meetinghouse was dedicated in Jacksonville. Another meetinghouse was completed in Oak Grove in 1907. In 1909, missionaries began working in Miami during the winter months.  Three years later, four Latter-day Saint pioneer families from Arizona moved to Florahome, Putnam County and established a Sunday School. In 1914, Julius C. Neubeck of Miami was called on a seven-month mission by Callis and became the first missionary from that city.  He then became presiding elder of the church in Miami following his mission.

By 1925, branches or Sunday Schools existed in Florahome, (Putnam County), Jacksonville, Sanderson, Tampa, Miami and in other places throughout the state. In February and March 1925, church president Heber J. Grant visited Jacksonville and held public meetings. Ten years later, the Florida District had 22 branches, and the West Florida District had another 13 branches.

The first stake in Florida and in the South was created in Jacksonville on January 19, 1947, by Callis, who by then was a member of the Quorum of the Twelve. Alvin C. Chace, a grandson of early leader George P. Canova, was called as the first president.

Due to the influx of immigrants Florida received over the past few decades from the Caribbean and other countries, branches and wards were created to accommodate foreign speaking individuals in Florida. The first Spanish-speaking stake in the southeastern United States was organized in Miami. This was followed by the creation of a second Spanish-speaking stake in Hialeah Gardens in 1998.

On October 9, 1994, church president Howard W. Hunter dedicated the Orlando Florida Temple. On January 19, 1997, church president Gordon B. Hinckley addressed more than 5,000 members at a conference in Jacksonville commemorating the stake's 50th anniversary.

The LDS Church has assisted in recovery  efforts from several natural disasters in Florida, and many Florida church members have responded to additional calls to give aid in surrounding states, such as the cleanup efforts following Hurricane Katrina, and Hurricane Irma, and major flooding in Georgia.  Increasing membership has enabled the magnitude of the church's involvement in disaster relief to grow substantially over time. In 2019, church president Russell M. Nelson visited Orlando and spoke to 15,000 members at the Amway Center and visited with the owner of Pulse nightclub, the gay nightclub in Orlando where a gunman killed 49 people in a mass shooting.

Deseret Ranches

Deseret Ranches, now part of the Cattle division of AgReserves, encompasses 295,000-acres and extends across Orange, Osceola and Brevard counties and is seen as critical to the Orlando region's water supply. The ranch is home to about a quarter million citrus trees, timberland, tree farms, commercial crops, and large deposits of fossilized seashells used in road base.

In 2013, the LDS Church purchased 382,834 acres from St. Joe Company in Bay, Calhoun, Franklin, Gadsden, Gulf, Jefferson, Leon, Liberty and Wakulla counties. The land, primarily timberland, was purchased for $565 million. The LDS Church is now Florida's largest private landowner. In 2020, the LDS Church sold more than 20,000 acres of land surrounding Lake Wimico in Florida to The Nature Conservancy who then donated the land to the state and the Florida Department of Environmental Protection.

Missions

On March 1, 1894 Florida became part of the Southern States Mission. The Florida Mission was then organized from the Southern States Mission on November 1, 1960. From the Florida Mission the Florida Tallahassee Mission and the Florida South Mission were formed on July 1, 1971. On June 20, 1974 the Florida South Mission changed its name to the Florida Fort Lauderdale Mission. Three additional missions has been created in Florida since then.

Temples
The state of Florida has five temples in various stages of construction or operation. The first, the Orlando Florida Temple, was dedicated on October 9, 1994, by church president Howard W. Hunter.  The Fort Lauderdale Florida Temple was announced by church president Thomas S. Monson on October 3, 2009, with ground broken for its construction on June 18, 2011. A public open house took place from March 29 to April 19, 2014. The temple was dedicated by Dieter F. Uchtdorf of the church's First Presidency on May 4, 2014. The temple is designed to serve an estimated 25,000 church members in South Florida.
As of November 2022, current church president Russell M. Nelson has announced temples to be constructed in Tallahassee, Tampa, and Jacksonville.

See also 

 The Church of Jesus Christ of Latter-day Saints membership statistics (United States)
 Religion in Florida

References

External links
 ComeUntoChrist.org Latter-day Saints Visitor site
 The Church of Jesus Christ of Latter-day Saints Official site